William Smith (born 29 September 1948) is an English former professional footballer who played as a full back in the Football League for Wimbledon. He also played non-league football for Leatherhead and was capped 14 times for the England amateur XI.

References

1948 births
Living people
Footballers from Tooting
English footballers
England amateur international footballers
Association football defenders
Leatherhead F.C. players
Wimbledon F.C. players
English Football League players